In number theory, the Ankeny–Artin–Chowla congruence is a result published in 1953 by N. C. Ankeny, Emil Artin and S. Chowla. It concerns the class number h of a real quadratic field of discriminant d > 0. If the fundamental unit of the field is

with integers t and u, it expresses in another form

for any prime number p > 2 that divides d. In case p > 3 it states that

where    and    is the Dirichlet character for the quadratic field. For p = 3 there is a factor (1 + m) multiplying the LHS. Here

represents the floor function of x.

A related result is that if d=p is congruent to one mod four, then

where Bn is the nth Bernoulli number.

There are some generalisations of these basic results, in the papers of the authors.

References

Theorems in algebraic number theory